In linguistics, the affix grammars over a finite lattice (AGFL) formalism is a notation for context-free grammars with finite set-valued features, acceptable to linguists of many different schools.

The AGFL-project aims at the  development of a technology for Natural language processing available under the GNU GPL.

External links
AGFL-project website

Grammar frameworks
Natural language processing
Free linguistic software